Kadim (also Romanized as Kadīm) is a village in Seydun-e Shomali Rural District, Seydun District, Bagh-e Malek County, Khuzestan Province, Iran. At the 2006 census, its population was 32, in 6 families.

References 

Populated places in Bagh-e Malek County